Doda may refer to:

Places
 Doda, Jammu and Kashmir, a town and a notified area committee in India
 Doda district, in Jammu and Kashmir, India
 Doda River, also known as the Stod River, in Jammu and Kashmir, India
 Doda, Punjab, a settlement in Punjab, India
 Doda Lake, in Quebec, Canada

People
 Doda (surname), including a list of people with this name
 Doda (singer) (Dorota Rabczewska-Stępień, born 1984), Polish musician
 Doda of Reims (born before 509), French saint
 Doda, wife of Saint Arnulf of Metz 
 Álvaro de Miranda Neto, known as Doda Miranda, Brazilian show jumper
 Doda Conrad (1905–1997), Polish-born American operatic singer
 Doda (footballer) (born 1984), Bruno Sarpa Costa, Brazilian footballer

Other uses
 Doda (drug), an opioid made from poppy husks
 Doda Bodonawieedo, a Star Wars character

See also 
 Dhoda (disambiguation)